HD 224693 b is an extrasolar planet orbiting the star HD 224693 every 27 days with a minimum mass 70% of Jupiter.

The planet HD 224693 b is named Xólotl. The name was selected in the NameExoWorlds campaign by Mexico, during the 100th anniversary of the IAU. Xólotl means animal in the native Nahuatl language and was an Aztec deity associated with the evening star (Venus).

See also
 79 Ceti b
 HD 33283 b
 HD 86081 b

References

External links
 

Cetus (constellation)
Giant planets
Exoplanets discovered in 2006
Exoplanets detected by radial velocity
Exoplanets with proper names